Polesie or Polesia is a swampy region in the Eastern European Lowland.

Polesie may also refer to the following villages in Poland:
Polesie, Kościan County in Greater Poland Voivodeship (west-central Poland)
Polesie, Środa Wielkopolska County in Greater Poland Voivodeship (west-central Poland)
Polesie, Łowicz County in Łódź Voivodeship (central Poland)
Polesie, Piotrków County in Łódź Voivodeship (central Poland)
Polesie, Poddębice County in Łódź Voivodeship (central Poland)
Polesie, Wieruszów County in Łódź Voivodeship (central Poland)
Polesie, Puławy County in Lublin Voivodeship (east Poland)
Polesie, Tomaszów Lubelski County in Lublin Voivodeship (east Poland)
Polesie, Płońsk County in Masovian Voivodeship (east-central Poland)
Polesie, Opole Voivodeship (south-west Poland)
Polesie, Pomeranian Voivodeship (north Poland)

See also
Orlovskoye Polesie
Polesie National Park